The 2011–12 OJHL season is the 18th season of the Ontario Junior Hockey League (OJHL) and the second since the league existed as two separate bodies in 2009–10. The twenty-seven teams of the North, South, East and West Divisions will play 49-game schedules.

Come February, the top teams of each division will play down for the Frank L. Buckland Trophy, the OJHL championship.  The winner of the Buckland Cup will compete in the Central Canadian Junior "A" championship, the Dudley Hewitt Cup.  If successful against the winners of the Northern Ontario Junior Hockey League and Superior International Junior Hockey League, the champion would then move on to play in the Canadian Junior Hockey League championship, the 2012 Royal Bank Cup.

Changes 
 Streetsville Derbys are gone, they merged into the Cobourg Cougars.
 Collingwood Blackhawks have ceased operations.
 Orangeville Flyers have ceased operations.
 Dixie Beehives have ceased operations.
 Villanova Knights move and are renamed Orangeville Flyers.
 Upper Canada Patriots are renamed Toronto Lakeshore Patriots.

Current Standings 
Note: GP = Games played; W = Wins; L = Losses; OTL = Overtime losses; SL = Shootout losses; GF = Goals for; GA = Goals against; PTS = Points; x = clinched playoff berth; y = clinched division title; z = clinched conference title

Teams listed on the official league website.

Standings listed by Pointstreak on official league website.

2011-12 Frank L. Buckland Trophy Playoffs

Playoff results are listed by Pointstreak on the official league website.

Dudley Hewitt Cup Championship
Hosted by the Thunder Bay North Stars in Thunder Bay, Ontario.  The Stouffville Spirit finished first in the round robin, but lost the final and finished second.

Round Robin
Stouffville Spirit 2 - Thunder Bay North Stars (SIJHL) 1 in overtime
Wisconsin Wilderness (SIJHL) 5 - Stouffville Spirit 2
Stouffville Spirit 10 - Soo Thunderbirds (NOJHL) 2
Final
Soo Thunderbirds (NOJHL) 5 - Stouffville Spirit 3

Scoring leaders 
Note: GP = Games played; G = Goals; A = Assists; Pts = Points; PIM = Penalty minutes

Leading goaltenders
Note: GP = Games played; Mins = Minutes played; W = Wins; L = Losses: OTL = Overtime losses; SL = Shootout losses; GA = Goals Allowed; SO = Shutouts; GAA = Goals against average

Award winners
 Top Scorer: Christian Finch (Stouffville Spirit)
 Top Defenceman: Paul Geiger (Stouffville Spirit)
 Most Gentlemanly Player: Dylan Goddard (Cobourg Cougars)
 Most Valuable Player: Christian Finch (Stouffville Spirit)
 Rookie of the Year: Devin Shore (Whitby Fury)
 Scholastic Player of the Year: Adam Shibuya (Toronto Jr. Canadiens)
 Playoff MVP: Drake Caggiula (Stouffville Spirit)
 Top Prospect: Devin Shore (Whitby Fury)
 Coach of the Year: Gregory Walters (Georgetown Raiders)
 Coach Canada Most Improved Player: Darcy Murphy (Wellington Dukes)
 Fan Favourite: Andrew Doyle (Stouffville Spirit)
 Top Goaltender: James Prigione (Oakville Blades)
 Executive of the Year: Ken Burrows (Stouffville Spirit)
 Volunteer of the Year: Karen Sheppard (Pickering Panthers and Whitby Fury)
 Trainer of the Year: Andrew Groombridge (Georgetown Raiders)
 Humanitarian of the Year: Matthew Dineen (Newmarket Hurricanes)

Players selected in 2012 NHL Entry Draft
Rd 2 #61 Devin Shore - Dallas Stars (Whitby Fury)
Rd 6 #170 James de Haas - Detroit Red Wings (Toronto Lakeshore Patriots) 
Rd 7 #190 Jamie Phillips - Winnipeg Jets (Toronto Jr. Canadiens)

See also 
 2012 Royal Bank Cup
 Dudley Hewitt Cup
 List of OJHL seasons
 Northern Ontario Junior Hockey League
 Superior International Junior Hockey League
 Greater Ontario Junior Hockey League
 2011 in ice hockey
 2012 in ice hockey

References

External links 
 Official website of the Ontario Junior Hockey League
 Official website of the Canadian Junior Hockey League

Ontario Junior Hockey League seasons
OJHL